William Jennings Buckner (born August 27, 1983) is an American former professional baseball pitcher, who played in Major League Baseball (MLB) for the Kansas City Royals, Arizona Diamondbacks, Los Angeles Angels of Anaheim, and San Diego Padres.

Baseball career

Kansas City Royals
Buckner was originally drafted in the 9th round (248th overall) by the Tampa Bay Devil Rays in the 2003 Major League Baseball Draft out of Young Harris College, but chose not to sign and instead played college baseball at the University of South Carolina. He was drafted again in 2004 by the Kansas City Royals in the second round as the 55th overall pick.

In his fourth season in the Royals organization, Buckner was called up to the big league club on August 24, 2007.

Arizona Diamondbacks
On December 14, 2007, Buckner was traded to the Arizona Diamondbacks for infielder Alberto Callaspo.

Detroit Tigers
On June 1, 2010, Buckner was traded to the Detroit Tigers for Dontrelle Willis and cash considerations. He was released on July 25, 2010.

Colorado Rockies
On December 20, 2010, Buckner was signed by the Colorado Rockies to a minor league deal with an invite to spring training. Buckner had hoped to compete for a spot on the roster, but spent the entire season in Triple-A with the Colorado Springs Sky Sox where he was 4–8 with a 6.03 ERA in 23 appearances. He was traded for a player to be named later however the Rockies never bothered to claim the other player.

Boston Red Sox
On March 2, 2012, Buckner signed a minor league deal with the Boston Red Sox with an invitation to their minor league camp. He was expected to compete for a starting pitching role in their system. Buckner began the season with the Double-A Portland Sea Dogs. He was called up to the Triple-A Pawtucket Red Sox but never reached the major league club. He elected free agency at the end of the season, in which he had a 3.65 ERA in 27 starts.

Los Angeles Angels of Anaheim
Buckner signed a minor league deal with the Los Angeles Angels on November 14, 2012. He was assigned to the Triple-A Salt Lake Bees. He was called up to the Angels on May 16 and made his first start since 2010 on May 25, 2013. He was designated for assignment on May 26, 2013. He was designated for assignment again on July 25, 2013. He was designated for assignment a third time on August 23, 2013.

San Diego Padres
On April 21, 2014, the San Diego Padres signed Buckner to a minor league deal. On May 24, the Padres selected his contract from the Triple-A El Paso Chihuahuas to make a start against the Chicago Cubs that night. He was designated for assignment the next day, and outrighted back to El Paso on May 27.

Milwaukee Brewers
Buckner signed a minor league deal with the Milwaukee Brewers on August 16, 2014.

Long Island Ducks
Buckner signed with the Long Island Ducks of the Atlantic League of Professional Baseball for the 2015 season.

He became a free agent after the 2015 season.

Return to Arizona Diamondbacks
On May 9, 2016, Buckner signed a minor league deal with the Arizona Diamondbacks. He became a free agent on November 7, 2016.

References

External links

1983 births
Living people
People from Decatur, Georgia
Kansas City Royals players
Arizona Diamondbacks players
Los Angeles Angels players
San Diego Padres players
Major League Baseball pitchers
Baseball players from Georgia (U.S. state)
Young Harris Mountain Lions baseball players
South Carolina Gamecocks baseball players
Idaho Falls Chukars players
Burlington Bees players
High Desert Mavericks players
Wichita Wranglers players
Omaha Royals players
Tucson Sidewinders players
Reno Aces players
Toledo Mud Hens players
Colorado Springs Sky Sox players
Portland Sea Dogs players
Pawtucket Red Sox players
Salt Lake Bees players
El Paso Chihuahuas players
Nashville Sounds players
Long Island Ducks players
Young Harris College alumni